Medlycott is a surname. Notable people with the surname include:

Adolph Medlycott (1838–1918), Indian Roman Catholic bishop
Keith Medlycott (born 1965), English cricketer
Thomas Medlycott (disambiguation), multiple people

Toponymic surnames